The Barn Church was built by William Lakie in Troy in Oakland County, Michigan in 1912 and was converted to a church when it stopped being used for its original function as a dairy barn. It is now a Michigan State Historic Site.

Prior to its purchase by the Presbyterian Church in 1928, electric interurban cars would stop at the barn to pick up milk to take to market.  The Presbyterians made some modifications to the barn to convert it for use as a house of worship.  This included removing the silo, adding a steeple and a new entrance, and transforming the hay loft into the chancel. 

In 1970 the church was sold by the Presbyterians to a growing Unitarian Universalist congregation from the nearby community of Clawson.  Emerson Church Unitarian Universalist called the "Barn Church" home until  2015 when they, and the neighboring Paint Creek Unitarian Universalist church of Rochester, decided to merge to form Beacon Unitarian Universalist Congregation.

See also 
Barn Church (disambiguation)
 Barn Church, Culloden, Scotland
 St Alban's Church, Cheam, London, England
 The Barn Church, Kew, London, England
 List of Michigan State Historic Sites

External links 
 List of State of Michigan Historic Sites
 Beacon Unitarian Universalist Congregation

1912 establishments in the United States
Barns in Michigan
Buildings and structures completed in 1912
Buildings and structures in Troy, Michigan
Former churches in Michigan
Presbyterian churches in Michigan
Unitarian Universalist churches in Michigan
Wooden churches in Michigan